Denisovka is a rural locality (a village) in Vereshchaginsky District, Perm Krai, Russia. The population was 16 as of 2010.

Geography 
Denisovka is located 19 km west of Vereshchagino (the district's administrative centre) by road. Zapolye is the nearest rural locality.

References 

Rural localities in Vereshchaginsky District